Itoyama (written: 糸山 or 絲山) is a Japanese surname. Notable people with the surname include:

, Japanese writer
, Japanese businessman and politician
, Japanese synchronized swimmer
, Japanese basketball player

Japanese-language surnames